The 2016 New Zealand Grand Prix event for open wheel racing cars was held at Manfeild Autocourse near Feilding on 14 February 2016. It was the sixty-first New Zealand Grand Prix and was open to Toyota Racing Series cars. The event was also the third race of the fifth round of the 2016 Toyota Racing Series, the final race of the series.

Twenty Tatuus-Toyota cars started the race which was won by 16-year-old Briton Lando Norris who became the fourth teenager in as many years to claim the Grand Prix after Mitch Evans, Nick Cassidy and Lance Stroll.

Norris took pole position and won the race from Russian Artem Markelov and Austrian Ferdinand Habsburg; Habsburg also achieved the fastest lap of the race.

Classification

Qualifying

Race 1 
Daruvala started from pole, but Norris shot into the lead. A battle ensued between Markelov and Piquet, with them eventually making contact, putting Piquet out of the race. Markelov would later be excluded from the race as a result. On the restart, Munro moved up into second, with Habsburg in third. Another driver would find himself excluded after an incident between Theo Bean and Nicolas Dapero. The stewards had determined that Dapero did not leave enough room on exit and subsequently excluded him from the race. On the second restart, Habsburg made a brilliant move to put himself in the lead, with Norris in second and Munro third. The two Kiwi's, Leitch and Cockerton, were fighting it out for a top five finish whilst Habsburg began to pull out a lead over Norris. After a mistake from Norris, Munro passed him for second, allowing the young Kiwi to pursue Habsburg. Guanyu Zhou retired three laps from the end with terminal problems, denting his championship hopes, but out in front it was Ferdiand Habsburg who would take the win, with James Munro in second and Lando Norris in third.

Race 2

Race 3 (Grand Prix)

References

External links
 Toyota Racing Series

Grand Prix
New Zealand Grand Prix
Toyota Racing Series
New Zealand Grand Prix